Grace & Grit is the debut studio album by Canadian country music artist Meghan Patrick. It was released on April 29, 2016, via Warner Music Canada. It includes the singles "Bow Chicka Wow Wow", "Grace & Grit", and "Still Loving You". The title track was the third highest-charting single by a Canadian female country singer in 2016, reaching number 12 on the Canada Country chart.

Track listing

Chart performance

Album

Singles

References

2016 debut albums
Meghan Patrick albums
Warner Music Group albums